Ben LeCompte (born February 1, 1993) is an American football punter who is currently a free agent. He played college football at North Dakota State University. He participated in The Spring League in 2017.

References

External links
 North Dakota State Bison bio

1993 births
Living people
American football punters
People from Barrington, Illinois
Players of American football from Illinois
Sportspeople from Cook County, Illinois
North Dakota State Bison football players
Chicago Bears players
The Spring League players